The trumpet manucode (Phonygammus keraudrenii) is a species of bird in the family Paradisaeidae.

The trumpet manucode is named after its powerful and loud trumpeting calls. The specific name, keraudrenii, commemorates French Navy physician Pierre François Keraudren (1769-1858).

The trumpet manucode is widely distributed throughout lowland rainforests of New Guinea, northern Cape York Peninsula, the Aru Islands, and the D'Entrecasteaux Islands, though certain subspecies are geographically distinct.  This species is monogamous.

Widespread and common throughout its large habitat range, the trumpet manucode is evaluated as Least Concern on the IUCN Red List of Threatened Species. It is listed on Appendix II of CITES.

Description
It has elongated horn-like head tufts and loose neck feathers. The plumage is of an iridescent blackish glossed blue, green and purple. It has a red iris, long coiled trachea, and blackish bill, mouth and legs. The female resembles the male, but is smaller in size and duller in color.

Some of the subspecies vary slightly among themselves, most notably in size and iridescence color.

 Diet 
The diet consists mainly of fruits and arthropods.

Subspecies
 Phonygammus keraudrenii adelberti Phonygammus keraudrenii aruensis Phonygammus keraudrenii diamondi Phonygammus keraudrenii gouldii Phonygammus keraudrenii hunsteini Phonygammus keraudrenii jamesi Phonygammus keraudrenii keraudrenii Phonygammus keraudrenii mayri Phonygammus keraudrenii neumanni Phonygammus keraudrenii purpureoviolaceaGallery

References

Further reading
Clench, Mary H. (1978). "Tracheal Elongation in Birds-of-Paradise". Condor'' 80 (4): 423–430.

External links

 BirdLife Species Factsheet

trumpet manucode
Birds of New Guinea
trumpet manucode
Taxa named by René Lesson
trumpet manucode